Lourdes Lozano (born 24 August 1962) is a Mexican fencer. She competed in the women's individual foil event at the 1984 Summer Olympics.

References

External links
 

1962 births
Living people
Mexican female foil fencers
Olympic fencers of Mexico
Fencers at the 1984 Summer Olympics
Pan American Games medalists in fencing
Pan American Games silver medalists for Mexico
Fencers at the 1983 Pan American Games